Ibrahima Diallo (born 1915 in Sedhiou, Senegal) was a Senegalese politician who served in the French Senate from 1956 to 1958.

References
 page on the French Senate website

Senegalese politicians
French Senators of the Fourth Republic
1915 births
1971 deaths
People from Sédhiou Region
Senators of French West Africa